KK Budućnost, currently known as Budućnost VOLI for sponsorship reasons, is a professional basketball club based in Podgorica, Montenegro. The club competes in Montenegrin Basketball League, Adriatic League and Eurocup. It is a part of the Budućnost Sports Society. The club is a founding member and shareholder of the Adriatic Basketball Association.

History

1949–1979: Formation and early years
The club was founded in 1949 when Budućnost sports society decided to form the men's basketball club. Budućnost participated in its first competition during the first part of June 1949, at the third Montenegrin Championship. The Championships took place in Cetinje, and in addition to Budućnost, three other teams from Montenegro participated. The first success came two years later – in 1951, when Budućnost took the first place in the First Championships of the Cities, which was held in Herceg-Novi.

In 1957, a new outdoor basketball court was constructed in the City Park, on the Morača river left bank.

Budućnost became champion of Montenegro for the first time in 1958. The championship was played in three zones, and many more teams took part this time. All credit for this achievement goes to: Martinović, Pavlović, Vujović, Đukić, Golubović, Lekić, Belada, Đurišić, Tamindžić and Vukčević. Because of this result, Buducnost got the chance to play in the qualifications for the First League. The qualifications did not take place, because of the decision of Yugoslav Basketball Federation that the team of Zastava from Kragujevac should play in the First League, without any matches being played.

In the 1959–60 season, Budućnost became the Montenegrin basketball champion for the second time. The Qualifications for the First League were played in Podgorica, and the teams of Dinamo Pančevo and Rabotnički Skoplje took part. Dinamo Pančevo eventually qualified for the First League.

Budućnost dominated Montenegrin basketball scene in the year of 1961. Because of the financial problems, the championships were reduced to a tournament played in Podgorica, and the home team easily won all of its matches.

Budućnost had to wait until 1969 for the new success. That year the team managed to win two trophies. In the Republic League, Budućnost won the first place and again became the Montenegrin basketball champion. Budućnost played the qualifications for the Second League group East once more, but in the very strong competition from clubs from Serbia and Macedonia they failed to qualify. The team also won the Championships of the Cities, for the third time in its history.

The year 1970 was the turning point for the Montenegrin basketball. The championships were played in the united league for the first time in history, without any zones. Budućnost became the Montenegrin basketball champion. The club managed to repeat the same success in the next year and became the Montenegrin basketball champion for the second time in a row (sixth overall). In the same year, the team finally managed to qualify for the Second League. Qualifications were held in Podgorica. Unfortunately, Budućnost managed to play for only one year in the Second League (1971–72).

In the 1973 Montenegrin champion was determined in a tie-breaker between Budućnost and Jedinstvo from Bijelo Polje, because both teams had the same number of points at the end of the season. The Game was played on the neutral court, and Budućnost proved that it still was the best. Both clubs took part in the qualifications for the Second League, but neither managed to qualify. The tournament was played in Skopje. Next year Budućnost had only one loss in the Montenegrin League and became the Montenegrin basketball champion once again. In the same year, the tournament of the Republics took place. The Budućnost players who played for Montenegro national basketball team were: Blažević, Begović, Pavićević, and Popović. The team managed to qualify for the Second League group South this year.

Because there was no suitable basketball arena in Titograd, Budućnost was forced to play its games in the Second League (season 1974–75) outside its hometown. Budućnost was by far the best team in group South – it had 11 wins and only 3 losses. That year the fusion of the clubs Akademik and Budućnost took place, so the team now had the best players from Akademik. The team roster for this year was: Begović, Brajović, Blažević, Šćepanović, Latković, Đurašković, I. Popović, M. Popović, Vukićević, Leković, Šarkić, Pavićević, Kazić and Martinović, and the head coach was Petar Blažević. The team achieved its first bigger success in Yugoslav Cup, qualifying for the Last 16 stage.

In the 1975–76 season, the Second League was once again dominated by Budućnost. At the end of the regular season Budućnost was tied with the team of Budućnost Peć, with 13 wins and 5 losses. In the tie-breaker that took place in Belgrade, the team from Podgorica was much better and won. The new players this season were Garić and Begović.

Next year the team was tied for the first place with the team of Kumanovo, but this Budućnost lost in the deciding tie-breaker. In the season of 1977–78 Budućnost qualified for the quarter-finals of the Yugoslav Cup, where it was beaten by Bosna. In the same year the team won the Montenegrin Cup.

1979–1986: Yugoslav First League promotion and successes
The 1979–80 season is very significant in club's history. Budućnost took the first place in the Second League and automatically qualified for the Yugoslav First Federal League. The players were: Nikola Antić, Dragan Ivanović, Duško Ivanović, Vukićević, Sutulović, Vukosavljević, Petrović, Borislav Đurović, Bojanić, Garić, Slavenko Rakočević, Nesević and Dragović. The team was coached by Rusmir Halilović. As hosts, the team had to play its games in Danilovgrad.

Budućnost's promotion to the First League brought a resurgence of popularity for the game of basketball in Titograd in the summer of 1980. The First League had a representative from Montenegro again after 15 years. Shortly before the debut in the First League, Morača Sports Center was opened and the team played all of its official matches there.

In its First League debut season, the team achieved a significant success finishing eight with a 9–13 record. Team roster for this year was: Dragan and Duško Ivanović, Nikola Antić, Žarko Knežević, Kovačević, Slavenko Rakočević, Goran and Milorad Bojanić, Borislav Đurović, Petrović, Milatović. The coaches were Čedomir Đurašković, with assistants Vukićević, Garić.

In the following season, the team managed to qualify for the play-off quarter-finals after beating Jugoplastika Split in three games. In the quarter-finals the team met with Crvena zvezda, who won twice in Belgrade, while Budućnost triumphed in Titograd.

Over its five top-tier seasons Budućnost fought hard to remain a First League participant, finding itself several times in relegation danger, but managing to overcome it. The big breakthrough would unexpectedly come in the 1985-86 season, its sixth in the top flight, although in the summer 1985 off-season it looked like Buducnost was in for another season of desperate struggle to stay up. Head coach Vlade Đurović left, taking an offer from KK Zadar and the player situation wasn't much better — club mainstays 26-year-old Goran Bojanić, 24-year-old Žarko Đurišić, and veteran Goran Rakočević left while even talented youth players joined the exodus as 18-year-old Zdravko Radulović transferred to KK Bosna, 21-year-old Saša Radunović took an offer from Wichita State University, and 17-year-old Luka Pavićević did the same with University of Utah.

Still despite all hardship, the incoming young head coach Milutin Petrović with a roster consisting of the Ivanović brothers, Nikola Antić, supreme young talent Žarko Paspalj, Milatović, Jadran Vujačić and Veselin Šćepanović, managed to lead the team to a 13–9 record and 3rd place in the league thus qualifying for the next season's Korać Cup, the club's first ever participation in the European competition.

1986–1998: European debut and domestic permanence

In its European debut Budućnost had three wins and five losses, overall. It began the competition in the first round, played over two legs, against Karşıyaka S.K., winning both games and qualifying for the round robin group where it got drawn with JuveCaserta, Estudiantes, and Challans. Out of six round robin games, Budućnost managed only a single win, which meant elimination from the Korać Cup.

Following a few years of historic success for the club, Budućnost got relegated at the end of the 1987–88 season finishing dead last with a 6–16 record. However, the very next year Budućnost was promoted and never lost its place in the First League again.

In the 1995–96 season, Budućnost won the Yugoslav Cup for the first time. In the final tournament, held in Nikšić, Budućnost defeated BFC Beočin and Partizan. Roster: Šćepanović, Pajović, Tomović, Đaletić, Mudreša, P. Popović, A. Ivanović, Đikanović, Darko Ivanović, Simović, Vukčević and Mugoša. Head coach was Živko Brajović.

The Yugoslav Cup was won for the second time in the 1997–98 season, also in Nikšić. In the final tournament Budućnost was better than Partizan and Beobanka. Roster: Šćepanović, Pajović, Krivokapić, Vukčević, Ostojić, A. Ivanović, M. Ivanović, Ćeranić, S. Peković, Radunović and Dragutinović. The team was coached by Goran Bojanić.

1998–2003: Prominent years
After wins in the Yugoslav Cup, Budućnost won three successive YUBA League championship titles. The first came in the 1998–99 season, in which the club had significant success in European competition. Budućnost qualified for the Saporta Cup semifinals, though lost to Benetton Treviso. Roster: Vlado Šćepanović, Gavrilo Pajović, Goran Bošković, Dejan Radonjić, Đuro Ostojić, Blagota Sekulić, Dragan Vukčević, Saša Radunović, Dragan Ćeranić, Nikola Bulatović, Balša Radunović and Željko Topalović. The team was coached by Miroslav Nikolić.

Budućnost won its second straight title without a loss (both in the regular season and in the play-offs) – a total of 27 wins. In the 1999–2000 season, Budućnost participated in the Euroleague for the first time. Due to the UN sanctions on FR Yugoslavia, Budućnost had to play its home game away from Podgorica (in Sarajevo and Budapest), but still managed to qualify for the Last 16 stage, where they lost to future champion Panathinaikos 2–1 after taking a great fight to the champion. Roster: Šćepanović, Pajović, Haris Brkić, Radonjić, Sekulić, Vukčević, Radunović, Vladimir Kuzmanović, Bulatović, Dejan Tomašević and Milenko Topić. The head coach was Miroslav Nikolić.

Budućnost won its first "double" in the 2000–01 season. The Final 8 tournament of the Yugoslav Cup was held in Vršac. In the quarterfinals Budućnost defeated Hemofarm, in the semifinals it defeated Lovćen, and in the finals, Budućnost outplayed Partizan, whom Budućnost also played and beaten in the play-off finals. In the modern Euroleague the team qualified for the Top 16 stage, losing to Real Madrid 0:2. Roster: Bojan Bakić, Brkić (went to Partizan at the half of the season), Saša Obradović, Radonjić, Igor Rakočević, Sekulić, Vukčević, Radunović,  Kuzmanović, Dejan Milojević, Tomašević, Topić and Jerome James. Head coach of the team was Bogdan Tanjević (the team was coached by Nikolić for three months in the first half of the season).

Over the next two seasons, 2001–2002 and 2002–2003, Budućnost lost many of its star players. In 2001–2002, Budućnost lost its positions to Partizan, who defeated Budućnost in both the Cup finals and the Yugoslavian League finals. After the season, Rakočević, the last player of the Budućnost golden age, departed for the NBA. In 2002–2003, Budućnost was led by talented young prospects Žarko Čabarkapa, Milojević and Aleksandar Pavlović. Despite their play, Budućnost plummeted to the last place in the standings in the EuroLeague and did not reach the finals of Serbian and Montenegran League.

2003–2006: Quieter years
A quieter period followed during which Budućnost took part in the ULEB Cup, though it missed the elimination rounds in 2004 and 2005. Budućnost reached the Serbia and Montenegro League semifinals in its last appearance in that competition.

2006–2011: Domestic dominance
Following the Montenegrin independence from Serbia and Montenegro in 2006, Budućnost naturally became the new team to beat in the reborn Montenegrin Basketball League and has won five consecutive titles since 2007 with a combined 89–1 record – which says plenty about its dominance. It still participated in the ABA League, with solid successes. Budućnost was close to making the Adriatic League Final Four in 2009–10 and missed out on the Eurocup after falling to Brose Baskets by a single point at the end of a home-and-away Qualifying Round series.

2011–present: Rise to regional prominence
In the 2010–11 season, Budućnost came up short in the Turkish Airlines Euroleague Qualifying Round and the Eurocup Regular Season, but once again won the Montenegrin League and the Montenegrin Cup titles. It also reached the Adriatic League Final Four, where it lost 62–58 against Partizan in the semifinals.

Since 2011, a Montenegrin retail company VOLI has been the general sponsor of the club, with company's CEO Dragan Bokan becoming the club's president. In domestic competitions, Budućnost continued its dominance by capturing its 11th consecutive Montenegrin Basketball League championship in 2016–17 season. Except being the runner-up to KK Sutjeska in 2013 Montenegrin Basketball Cup, it clinched all trophies from 2011 to 2017. Also, it became a standard EuroCup participant and one of top five teams of the ABA League in period from 2011 to 2017, reaching to the semifinal for five times.

In June 2017, Aleksandar Džikić was named as the head coach of Budućnost. In February 2018, Budućnost won its 5th consecutive and 11th in total Montenegrin Basketball Cup, after beating KK Mornar Bar with 87–83 in the final game. In the ABA League, it secured second place of the regular season with 17–5 score. In the semifinal series of ABA League, it eliminated the Croatian team Cedevita with 2–1 score. In April 2018, Budućnost with 3–1 score won in the final series of the ABA League against the reigning champions Crvena zvezda. Thus, they were crowned champions of the ABA League for the first time in history and also secured a spot in 2018–19 EuroLeague, that would become its first appearance in the elite European competition after 16 seasons. Budućnost actually lost the Prva A Liga finals for the first time since the establishment of the league in 2007.

In the middle of 2018–19 season, after series of bad results Budućnost sacked Džikić and named Jasmin Repeša as team's head coach. Also, it added several high-profile names to its roster, among whom were Goga Bitadze and Norris Cole. However, even with much stronger roster in second half of the season, Budućnost failed to fulfill any goals that were set at the beginning of the season. In 2018–19 EuroLeague, Budućnost finished in 15th place having the second-worst record of 6 wins and 24 losses. In the 2018–19 ABA League First Division, it failed to defend the title in repeated final series match-up of previous season, losing to Crvena zvezda with 3–2 in series. In the A Liga, Budućnost won back the championship.

Rivalry

Home arena

Budućnost plays its home games at Morača Sports Center (Montenegrin: Sportski centar Morača, Спортски центар Морача), a sport venue located in Podgorica, Montenegro. The venue is located in the new part of Podgorica, on the right bank of Morača River, after which it got its name. Construction of this sports complex began in 1978, and various sport facilities are scattered across a five-hectare area. Today, its main sports hall has a capacity of 5,500 seats

Supporters

Buducnost fans are known as Varvari (Barbarians), a group founded in 1987. The group's traditional colours are blue and white, which are also the colours of all the Budućnost sports clubs. For FK Budućnost Podgorica home games, Varvari occupy the northern stand (Sjever) of the Podgorica city stadium. They also have a reserved stand at the Morača Sports Center, as supporters of KK Buducnost basketball club.
The focal point for the group during the late 1990s was the basketball club, which started investing heavily while the football club toiled in the lower half of the table.

Since its foundation years, Varvari has gained a reputation as a violent group, and in the recent history they made a few biggest accidents on the football matches. At First League 2004-05 game Budućnost - Partizan Belgrade, flares, blocks, construction materials and similar objects were thrown from the North stand to the pitch and match was abandoned for 15 minutes. Year later, game Budućnost - Crvena Zvezda Belgrade was suspended for two hours after home supporters (Varvari) threw tear gas on the pitch and, after that, attacked visitors' ultras. On the spring 2006, there was a crowd violence on the local rivals game Budućnost - Zeta. In the Montenegrin First League, numerous matches of FK Budućnost were suspended due to crowd violence or crowd-invasion to the pitch. During the last seasons, there was an escalation of violence on Montenegrin Derby games.

They are the best organised and largest fan group in Montenegro. According to many fan magazines from the Balkan they are the only fans in Montenegro who are on the level of the largest fan groups from ex-Yugoslavia.

Season by season
The following table contains information from season 2006–07 onward:

Source: Eurobasket.com

Honours

Domestic competitions

League
 Montenegrin League
 * Winners (14): 2007, 2008, 2009, 2010, 2011, 2012, 2013, 2014, 2015, 2016, 2017, 2019, 2021, 2022
Runners-up (1): 2018
 Serbia and Montenegro League
 * Winners (3): 1999, 2000, 2001
 *Runners-up (1): 2002

Cups
 Montenegrin Cup
 * Winners (15): 2007, 2008, 2009, 2010, 2011, 2012, 2014, 2015, 2016, 2017, 2018, 2019, 2020, 2021, 2022
Runners-up (1): 2013
 Serbia and Montenegro Cup
 * Winners (3): 1996, 1998, 2001
 *Runners-up (1): 2002

International success
  EuroLeague:
 Top 16 (2): 1999–00, 2000–01
  EuroCup
 1/4 Finals (4): 2011–12, 2012-13, 2017-18, 2020-21

Regional competitions
 Adriatic League
 Winners (1): 2018
 Runners-up (2): 2019, 2021
Final Four (6): 2010, 2011, 2014, 2015, 2016, 2017

Other competitions
 Igalo, Montenegro Invitational Game 
 Winners (1): 2008

Players

Current roster

Depth chart

Head coaches

  Nikola Sekulović 
  Rusmir Halilović 
  Čedomir Đurašković 
  Vlade Đurović 
  Milutin Petrović 
  Miodrag Baletić 
  Goran Bojanić 
  Živko Brajović 
  Milovan Stepandić 
  Goran Bojanić 
  Miroslav Nikolić 
  Bogdan Tanjević 
  Zoran Sretenović 
  Miodrag Kadija 
  Darko Ruso 
  Zvezdan Mitrović 
  Vlade Đurović 
  Miodrag Baletić 
  Zoran Martič 
  Dejan Radonjić 
  Igor Jovović 
  Luka Pavićević 
  Vlado Šćepanović 
  Ilias Zouros 
  Aleksandar Džikić 
  Jasmin Repeša 
  Petar Mijović 
  Slobodan Subotić 
  Petar Mijović 
  Dejan Milojević 
  Aleksandar Džikić 
  Vlada Jovanović

Notable players

By far the best known player to come through KK Budućnost ranks is Žarko Paspalj, Yugoslav national basketball team stalwart who had a basketball career that included successful stops all over Europe as well as a brief NBA stint in the late 1980s.

Notable players

  Duško Ivanović
  Goran Bošković
  Nikola Bulatović
  Žarko Čabarkapa
  Goran Ćakić
  Igor Perović
  Milenko Topić
  Đuro Ostojić
  Gavrilo Pajović
  Aleksandar Pavlović
  Haris Brkić
  Vladimir Kuzmanović
  Saša Obradović
  Bojan Subotić
  Dejan Tomašević
  Žarko Paspalj
  Bojan Bakić
  Vladimir Dašić
  Vladimir Dragičević
  Bojan Dubljević
  Nikola Ivanović
  Goran Jeretin
  Ivan Koljević
  Vladimir Mihailović
  Nenad Mijatović
  Luka Pavićević
  Aleksa Popović
  Marko Popović
  Dejan Radonjić
  Nemanja Radović
  Balša Radunović
  Žarko Rakočević
  Boris Savović
  Blagota Sekulić
  Vlado Šćepanović
  Sead Šehović
  Mladen Šekularac
  Slavko Vraneš
  Nikola Vučević
  Nemanja Gordić
  Aleksandar Marić
  Jermaine Anderson
  Kyle Landry
  Owen Klassen
  Darko Planinić
  Robert Rikić
  Edwin Jackson
  Gerald Lee
  Gintaras Kadžiulis
  Deji Akindele
  Aleksandar Ćapin
  Hasan Rizvić
  Alen Omić
  Tadija Dragićević
  Nemanja Jaramaz
  Nikola Jestratijević
  Zoran Jovanović
  Bojan Krstović
  Vladimir Micov
  Dejan Milojević
  Nikola Otašević
  Ivan Paunić
  Miljan Pavković
  Igor Rakočević
  Marko Simonović
  Željko Topalović
  Čedomir Vitkovac
   Omar Cook
   Justin Doellman
  Andre Brown
  Acie Earl
  Jerome James
  Julius Jenkins
  Dee Bost
  Kyle Gibson
  Doron Lamb
  J. R. Reynolds
  Marcus Williams
  Shawn James
  Earl Clark
  Coty Clarke
  Norris Cole
  Sean Kilpatrick
  Scott Bamforth
  Hassan Martin
  Justin Cobbs

Players at the NBA Draft

Players who played in the NBA
  Žarko Paspalj
  Žarko Čabarkapa
  Aleksandar Pavlović
  Slavko Vraneš
  Nikola Vučević
  Omar Cook
  Igor Rakočević
  Andre Brown
  Acie Earl
  Jerome James
  Doron Lamb
  Marcus Williams
  Earl Clark
  Coty Clarke
  Norris Cole
  Sean Kilpatrick
  Rashad Vaughn
  Willie Reed
  Goga Bitadze

Sponsorships

See also
 SD Budućnost Podgorica
 FK Budućnost Podgorica
 ŽKK Budućnost Podgorica
 Montenegrin Derby
 Montenegrin basketball clubs in European competitions

References

External links
 Official website 
 Official supporters' website
 Eurobasket.com KK Buducnost Page

KK Budućnost
Basketball teams in Montenegro
Basketball teams established in 1949
Basketball teams in Yugoslavia